Padalio River is a river in western India in Gujarat whose origin is Khambhaliya hills. Its drainage basin has a maximum length of 110 km.

References

Rivers of Gujarat
Rivers of India